Joshua Daniel Whitehouse is an American politician who served as a member of the New Hampshire House of Representatives for the town of Farmington from 2014 to 2016.

Early life and education 
Whitehouse completed coursework towards a Bachelor of Arts degree in political science from Saint Anselm College.

Career 
Whitehouse has been a member of the New Hampshire Republican State Committee since 2014 and served on the Executive Board of the New Hampshire Young Republicans from 2013 to 2016.

From March 2015 to February 2016, Whitehouse worked as the coalitions coordinator for the Donald Trump 2016 presidential campaign. Because of his work on the campaign, Whitehouse was largely absent from votes in the New Hampshire House of Representatives, and did not run for re-election in 2016.

After Donald Trump was elected, Whitehouse served as an assistant to the Under Secretary of Agriculture for Research, Education, and Economics from January 20, 2017 to September 16, 2017. After leaving the Department of Agriculture, Whitehouse worked on as communications director on Robert Burns' 2018 congressional campaign for New Hampshire's 2nd district. Burns placed fourth in the Republican primary.

In March 2020, Whitehouse was appointed as the Trump administration's liaison to the Department of Homeland Security. In September 2020, Whitehouse was appointed as the administration's liaison to the Department of Defense. In January 2021, acting defense secretary Christopher C. Miller appointed him to the Commission on the Naming of Items of the Department of Defense that Commemorate the Confederate States of America or Any Person Who Served Voluntarily with the Confederate States of America, which was established by the 2021 NDAA. On February 12, 2021, he and other Miller appointees to the commission were removed by newly-confirmed defense secretary Lloyd Austin.

References

Saint Anselm College alumni
Republican Party members of the New Hampshire House of Representatives
Trump administration personnel